Rajat Tokas is an Indian television actor. He appeared in television series like Dharti Ka Veer Yodha Prithviraj Chauhan, Dharam Veer,  Tere Liye, Jodha Akbar, Naagin season 1 & 3 and Chandra Nandini.

Career

Tokas started his television career with show Bongo as Ashu on DD national. He then did many shows including Lighthouse for children, Jadui Chirag, Tarang, and Ye Hawayan. In 2005, he came to Mumbai with his father & bagged the role of Tantya, who was Sai Baba's brother, in Sai Baba.

In 2006, Tokas was selected by Sagar Arts to play his first lead role of young Prithviraj Chauhan in the series Dharti Ka Veer Yodha Prithviraj Chauhan for which he won best actor in ITA 2007.

In 2008 he was again selected by Sagar Arts to play Veer in the NDTV imagine show Dharam Veer.

In 2010-11, Ekta Kapoor of Balaji Telefilms chose Rajat to play the parallel lead in Tere Liye where he played the character of Robindo Ganguly. Later, he did episodic roles in Bandini and Fear Files: Darr Ki Sacchi Tasvirein.

In 2013, he was once again selected by Kapoor to reprise the role of the Mughal Emperor Jalaluddin Mohammed Akbar in her historical drama, Jodha Akbar for which he went on to win BIG Star Most Entertaining Television Actor - Male, Star Guild Award for Best Actor in a Drama Series, Boroplus Gold Award for Best Actor in Lead Role (Critics), Indian Telly Award for Best Actor in a Lead Role. In 2016, he played the negative role of Kabir (Icchadhari Nevla) in Naagin, a fantasy drama which was aired on Colors TV. 

Also in 2016 he was selected by Balaji Telefilms to play the lead role of Chandragupta Maurya in Star Plus show Chandra Nandini. He also played the role Vikrant on Naagin 3, again produced by Balaji Telefilms.

Early and personal life 
He studied in the Hope Hall Foundation School, R. K. Puram, Delhi and later on completed his graduation through distance mode.

On 30 January 2015, he married Shrishti Nayyar, a theatre actor.

Filmography

Television

Special appearances

Awards

See also 
 List of Indian television actors

References

External links
 

21st-century Indian male actors
Living people
Indian male television actors
People from South West Delhi district
Indian male soap opera actors
Male actors from Delhi
1991 births